Gao Tianyi (born 1 July 1998) is a Chinese professional footballer who currently plays for Chinese Super League club Beijing Guoan.

Club career
Gao Tianyi started his professional career with China League One side Shenzhen in 2016.  On 13 February 2017, Gao transferred to Super League side Jiangsu Suning. On 1 March 2017, Gao made his debut for Jiangsu Suning in the 2017 AFC Champions League against Adelaide United, coming on as a substitute for Zhang Xiaobin in the 80th minute. He made his Super League debut on 5 March 2017 in a 4–0 away defeat against Shanghai Shenhua. 

Able to take up a mandatory under-23 spot within the team, he would initially gain significant playing time at Jiangsu, but by the 2019 Chinese  Super League season he would be unable to command the same amount of game time and was loaned out back to fellow top tier club Shenzhen. On his return back to Jiangsu, Gao would fight to gain more playing time and was part of the squad that won the 2020 Chinese Super League title with them. On 28 February 2021, the parent company of the club Suning Holdings Group announced that operations were going to cease immediately due to financial difficulties.

On 16 February 2021, Beijing Guoan announced the signing of Gao. He was given the number 15 shirt. He would make his debut in a league game against Shanghai Shenhua on 24 April 2021 that ended in a 2-1 defeat.

International career
On 24 March 2022, Gao made his international debut in a 1–1 draw against Saudi Arabia in the 2022 FIFA World Cup qualification.

Career statistics 
Statistics accurate as of match played 31 January 2023.

Honours

Club
Jiangsu Suning
Chinese Super League: 2020.

References

External links
 

1998 births
Living people
Chinese footballers
Chinese expatriate footballers
Association football midfielders
Footballers from Dalian
Shenzhen F.C. players
Jiangsu F.C. players
Beijing Guoan F.C. players
Chinese Super League players
China League One players
Expatriate footballers in Spain
Chinese expatriate sportspeople in Spain
CF Damm players